Shakhtarsk or Shakhtyorsk is a city in Donetsk Oblast, eastern Ukraine, currently occupied by Russia. Regionally, the city is an administrative urban enclave also consisting of cities Chystiakove and Snizhne and surrounded by Shakhtarsk Raion. It serves as the administrative center of Shakhtarsk Raion which it does not belong to. Population:

History

Urban-type settlement since 1938.

A local newspaper is published here since May 1946.

In August 1953 the urban-type settlement Katyk became a city Shakhtyorsk.  is a coal miner.

In 1964, a trade college was opened here.

In 1985, the population of the city was 72 thousand people, the basis of the economy was coal mining.

In 1989, the population of the city was 73 854 people, the basis of the economy were coal mining, manufacture of clothes and knitwear.

Since Soviet times until 1997, there were four vocational schools (№ 70, № 71, № 97 and № 98) and one college (a college of commerce and trade); in May 1997, the vocational school № 71 was closed.

In 2000, a textile factory went bankrupt. After the beginning of the economic crisis in 2008, the mechanical-repair plant became bankrupt and was closed.

In 2013, the population was 51 007 people.

Starting mid-April 2014, the self-proclaimed Donetsk People's Republic occupied towns in Donetsk Oblast; including Shakhtarsk. On 27 July 2014, Ukrainian forces and pro-Russian local militia claimed Ukrainian troops had entered Shakhtarsk. On 30 July 2014, the DPR militia resumed control of the city.

Demographics
According to the 2001 Ukrainian Census:

Gallery

References

Cities in Donetsk Oblast
Don Host Oblast
Populated places established in the Ukrainian Soviet Socialist Republic
Cities of regional significance in Ukraine
Shakhtarsk
Horlivka Raion